Hedingham & Chambers is a bus operator, part of the larger Go East Anglia unit within Go-Ahead, consisting of the Hedingham and Chambers brands. The group was formed when Go-Ahead purchased the two firms in June 2012. Since the sale, the two brands have been retained with assets, such as depots, shared along with the launch of a unified website in 2021.

Hedingham
Hedingham is a public bus brand operated by Hedingham & Chambers in Essex,  itself a subsidiary of the Go-Ahead Group (forming part of the Go East Anglia).

History

In 1921 Aubrey Letch shortly after serving in World War I, with his parents' help, trading under his own name commenced operating a coach hire company, gradually expanding to run bus services to Braintree and Sudbury on their market days of Wednesday and Thursday respectively. In March 1935 Letch purchased the competing business of PW Finch of Castle Hedingham. This allowed Letch to take over the Monday to Saturday workers' service to Braintree. In the late 1950s, he further expanded the business with routes to Gestingthorpe, Pebmarsh and Halstead.

In early 1960, Letch retired due to ill health and sold the company to Donald MacGregor, which was renamed Hedingham & District Omnibuses. Since then the company has grown by acquiring other companies, including:
 Blackwells of Earls Colne (1965)
 C & R Coach of Little Tey (1982)
 Freemans Coaches (1997)
 GW Osborne of Tollesbury (1997)
 Jennings of Ashen (1984)
 Kemps Coaches of Clacton-on-Sea
 CJ Partridge and Sons (Claireaux) of Hadleigh, Suffolk
 Wents of Boxford (1997)

In March 2012 the company was sold to the Go-Ahead Group, forming part of Go East Anglia. Following this, 'Hedingham' became the widely accepted company name and as such is no longer referred to as 'Hedingham Omnibuses'.

Depots
Three depots are located in:
 Clacton
 Sible Hedingham
 Kelvedon

Hedingham used to have a depot in Tollesbury however it closed in 2016 due to cuts.

Livery
Hedingham Omnibuses' livery was cream with red relief, until the 1970s being blue and cream. The livery varied between single deckers/ coaches and double deck buses, with red being the main colours on double deckers with cream relief. The GoAhead Group have, more recently, introduced a livery consisting of a red base, with a maroon front section - identical to that now used by Chambers.

Many buses are transferred from other Go-Ahead subsidiaries. These typically retain their former liveries, as they are end of life vehicles nearing scrapping, or the peak vehicle requirement requires all vehicles to be available, rather than being repainted. Recent transfers include buses from Konectbus, Carousel Buses and Go-Ahead London.

Operations 

Hedingham operates in various areas of Essex, extending from Harwich in the north to Tollesbury in the south. The main centre of operations is Clacton-on-Sea, where the company took over the majority of the town's routes following First Essex's withdrawal. Hedingham also operates around Colchester, Halstead, Braintree and Witham, as well as serving villages and the island of West Mersea on council-supported routes.

Flagship routes for the company includes:
 88: Halstead-Colchester (operated in a Quality Bus Partnership with First)
 89: Braintree-Halstead
 'The Seasiders'''
 X76: Jaywick-Clacton-Colchester
 63: West Mersea-Colchester
 'Clacton Breeze An open-top bus service operating between Clacton-on-Sea and Holland-on-Sea during the summer season.
Some routes have received buses fitted with free wifi and route branding.

In Popular Culture

Two former Hedingham Omnibuses (Bristol VRTs RUA 461W, HJB 455W) masqueraded as London Buses in the 2009 Doctor Who Easter special, Planet of the Dead. The original livery can be seen in the accompanying behind-the-scenes special Doctor Who Confidential: Desert Storm.

ChambersChambers is a public bus brand operated by Hedingham & Chambers in Sudbury, Suffolk, itself a subsidiary of the Go-Ahead Group (forming part of the Go East Anglia).

History
In 1877 H Chambers commenced a horse-drawn bus business in Bures. In 1918 the first bus was purchased to operate a twice weekly service between Sudbury and Colchester. By the late 1930s routes were operated to Halstead and Haverhill. It also diversified into the haulage business, Chambers exited from this business in the 1960s.

In June 2012 Chambers was sold to the Go-Ahead Group with 27 buses. The depot was not included in the sale with operations moving to fellow Go-Ahead company Hedingham''' in Sudbury although it still trades under the Chambers name.

Services
As of April 2019, Chambers operate 14 services (under review as of Jan 2020). Both urban and rural areas are served, many of the company's routes running into Sudbury, and serving the bus station near Sudbury railway station.

Fleet
As at April 2019 the fleet consisted of 30 buses and 2 coaches. Since the Go-Ahead purchase a new red and maroon fleet livery has been introduced.

See also
 List of bus operators of the United Kingdom

References

External links
 Archived Hedingham website (2011)
 Archived Chambers website (2011)

Bus operators in Essex
Companies based in Essex
Transport in Essex
Transport in Suffolk
Transport in the City of Chelmsford
Bus operators in Suffolk
Transport companies established in 1877
1877 establishments in England
British companies established in 1921
Transport companies established in 1921
1921 establishments in England
Transport companies established in 2012